Marit Breivik (born 10 April 1955) is a former Norwegian team handball player, and former head coach for the Norway women's national handball team. As coach, she has led the team to victory in the 2008 Olympic tournament, the World Women's Handball Championship in 1999, and four European Women's Handball Championships, in 1998 (Netherlands), 2004 (Hungary), 2006 (Sweden) and 2008 (Macedonia).

Playing career
She was born in Levanger. As a player she played 140 games with the Norwegian national team from 1975 to 1983. She won three Norwegian national championships with her club Skogn IL.

She has her education from the Norwegian School of Sport Sciences.

Coaching career
Breivik has been coach for clubs such as Byåsen IL and Larvik HK, and from 1994 head coach for the Norwegian national female team. She is appointed at the Olympiatoppen where she is responsible coach for team sports. Among her achievements are one Olympic gold and one bronze medal, one World Championship win and two silver medals, three European Championship wins, two silver and one bronze medal.

Breivik is known for her calm, controlled coaching style, for solid knowledge and for constantly trying to develop the sport. As an example of the latter, Norway often swaps the goalkeeper for an extra player in five-to-six penalty play, in order to be able to keep up a normal attack (at the expense of greatly increased vulnerability during a counter-attack if the ball should be lost).

In January 2009 Breivik announced that she had decided to step down as national coach after 15 years on the job.

Achievements
Olympic Games
1996: 4th
2000: 3rd
2004: did not qualify
2008: 1st

World Championships
1995: 4th
1997: 2nd
1999: 1st
2001: 2nd
2003: 6th
2005: 9th
2007: 2nd

European Championships
1994: 3rd
1996: 2nd
1998: 1st
2000: 6th
2002: 2nd
2004: 1st
2006: 1st
2008: 1st

Awards and recognitions
On 16 March 2009, King Harald V of Norway appointed Breivik Knight, First Class of the Royal Norwegian Order of St. Olav for her efforts as a role model in Norwegian sports.

Personal life
Breivik was married to the former secretary general of the Norwegian Handball Federation, Niels Hertzberg. Hertzberg died during a holiday in Brazil on 2 March 2013, at age 72. The couple had no children, although her husband had a child from a previous marriage.

Breivik has also been active in politics. She represented the Socialist Left Party in Levanger municipal council from 1987 to 1991, but has stated that she votes Labour in national elections.

References

1955 births
Living people
Norwegian female handball players
Norwegian handball coaches
Norwegian Olympic coaches
Female sports coaches
People from Levanger
Socialist Left Party (Norway) politicians
Politicians from Nord-Trøndelag
Norwegian School of Sport Sciences alumni